Rollieria is a Jurassic ammonite belonging to the order Ammonitida.

Distribution 
France, Germany, Kenya, Switzerland and Tanzania

References
Notes

Jurassic ammonites